Stuart James Wilson Wark (born 31 August 1989) is a Scottish-born Malaysian professional footballer who plays as a centre back for Thai League 2 club Kasetsart.

Club career

Lugar Boswell Thistle
In July 2012, Stuart signed a three-year contract with a Scottish football club Lugar Boswell Thistle. From 2012 until 2015, he made 60 appearances with the club and scored 36 goals for Lugar Boswell Thistle.

Albany Creek Excelsior
On 1 June 2015, Stuart joined a Brisbane Premier League side Albany Creek Excelsior from Lugar Boswell Thistle. He only joined the team for a short 2 months. He made 8 appearances for Albany Creek Excelsior and scored 1 goal.

Johor Darul Ta'zim II
In August 2015, Stuart signed for JDT reserve team that playing in Malaysia Premier League, JDT II ahead for 2016 Malaysia Premier League season.

Sabah
In July 2016, Stuart joined a Malaysia Premier League side Sabah for a one-year term from JDT II. Stuart made his unofficial team debut with Sabah in a friendly match against Terengganu.

Felda United
In January 2017, Stuart signed a two-year contract with Felda United in Malaysia Premier League. Under the management of B. Sathianathan, he made 31 appearances with the team and scored 1 goal. He became the champion of 2018 Malaysia Premier League after Felda United secured the top spot in the table for the 2018 season and secured a promotion spot in 2019 Malaysia Super League.

Penang
In January 2019, Stuart signed for a fellow Malaysia Premier League side Penang.
Under the management of Ahmad Yusof, He made 8 appearances with Penang in the 2019 Malaysia Premier League. He didn't score any goal for the 2019 season.

PDRM 
In June 2019, Stuart Wark signed for PDRM in the Malaysia Premier League.

Terengganu 
On 6 January 2020, Stuart Wark signed a one-year contract for Terengganu in the Malaysia Super League.

Sarawak United 
In January 2021, Stuart signed for Malaysia Premier League side Sarawak United.

On 14 November 2021, Stuart made his debut with Malaysia Super League side Sarawak United FC in a 1-2 lose against Terengganu F.C. in the Malaysia Cup quarter final. Stuart made his team debut after got selected in the team first eleven.

Kasetsart FC 
On January 2023, Stuart Wark signed for Thai League 2 side Kasetsart F.C..
On 28th January 2023, Stuart Wark made his Thai League 2 debut by coming off the bench in Kasetsart F.C. 2-1 win over Trat F.C. He got subbed in 78th minutes replacing Patakorn Hanratana.

Career statistics

Club

Notes

Honours

Club

Felda United
 Malaysia Premier League: 2018

References

External links
 

Malaysian footballers
Malaysia international footballers
Malaysia Super League players
Malaysia Premier League players
Living people
1989 births
Scottish people of Malaysian descent
Association football midfielders
Scottish footballers
Lugar Boswell Thistle F.C. players
Penang F.C. players
Felda United F.C. players
Sarawak United FC players
Scottish Junior Football Association players